José María Colon (born May 1, 1947) is a Spanish sprint canoer who competed in the late 1960s. He was eliminated in the semifinals of the K-1 1000 m event at the 1968 Summer Olympics in Mexico City.

References
Sports-reference.com profile

External links

1947 births
Canoeists at the 1968 Summer Olympics
Living people
Olympic canoeists of Spain
Spanish male canoeists
Place of birth missing (living people)